Elizabeth Ho (born May 2, 1983) is an American actress.

Early life and career
Ho was born and raised in San Francisco, California. Her mother is actress and dancer Jennifer Ann Lee, who appeared in a number of Broadway productions including A Chorus Line and Jesus Christ Superstar. She attended Crystal Springs Uplands School in Hillsborough, California. Ho first studied business at the University of Southern California, but left for a year and returned to enroll in the school's theater program, earning a Bachelor of Arts in theater.

Since 2007, Ho has guest starred in the television series Women's Murder Club, Castle, Grey's Anatomy, Two and a Half Men, Miami Medical and played the lead role in the independent short film, Kilo. She played Rhonda Cheng on Melissa & Joey and Debbie Lee on Rake. She has also narrated over 750 videos on Study.com, on a variety of subjects from science to music.

Filmography

References

External links

1983 births
21st-century American actresses
American film actresses
American television actresses
Living people
Actresses from San Francisco
Marshall School of Business alumni
USC School of Dramatic Arts alumni